Call Me Back may refer to:

"Call Me Back", a song by The Strokes from Angles
"Call Me Back", a song by Young the Giant from Mirror Master
"Call Me Back", a song by Tanya Stephens from 2004